Zainab Damilola Alabi (born 16 October 2002) is Nigerian badminton player. She participated in major badminton events at both local and international level. As a junior player, she won three bronze medals at the 2018 African Youth Games held in Algiers, Algeria. Alabi then won the women's singles bronze medal at the 2019 African Championships, and also the mixed team gold medal at the 2019 Rabat African Games.

Achievements

African Championships 
Women's singles

African Youth Games 
Girls' singles

Mixed doubles

References

External links 
 

1994 births
Living people
Nigerian female badminton players
Competitors at the 2019 African Games
African Games gold medalists for Nigeria
African Games medalists in badminton
Yoruba sportswomen
21st-century Nigerian women